Sense and Sensibility is a novel by Jane Austen.

Sense and Sensibility may also refer to:
Sense and Sensibility (1971 TV series), BBC television adaptation
Sense and Sensibility (film) (1995), by Ang Lee
Sense and Sensibility (soundtrack)
Kandukondain Kandukondain (2000), a Tamil-language film adaptation
Sense and Sensibility (2008 TV series), by John Alexander
Sense and Sensibility (1981 TV series), by Rodney Bennett
Sense and Sensibility and Sea Monsters (2009), a parody novel by Ben H. Winters
"Sense and Senility" (1987), the fourth episode of the BBC sitcom Blackadder the Third

See also 
 Sense and Sensibilia (disambiguation)
 Accolades received by Sense and Sensibility (disambiguation)